Finland competed at the 1956 Summer Olympics in Melbourne, Australia and Stockholm, Sweden (equestrian events). 64 competitors, 63 men and 1 woman, took part in 62 events in 14 sports.

Medalists

Gold
 Pentti Linnosvuo — Shooting, Men's Free Pistol
 Rauno Mäkinen — Wrestling, Men's Greco-Roman Featherweight
 Kyösti Lehtonen — Wrestling, Men's Greco-Roman Lightweight

Silver
 Olavi Mannonen — Modern Pentathlon, Men's Individual Competition

Bronze
 Voitto Hellsten — Athletics, Men's 400 metres
 Veikko Karvonen — Athletics, Men's Marathon
 Jorma Valkama — Athletics, Men's Long Jump
 Pentti Hämäläinen — Boxing, Men's Featherweight
 Raimo Heinonen, Onni Lappalainen, Olavi Leimuvirta, Berndt Lindfors, Martti Mansikka, and Kalevi Suoniemi — Gymnastics, Men's Team Combined Exercises
 Wäinö Korhonen — Modern Pentathlon, Men's Individual Competition
 Berndt Katter, Wäinö Korhonen, and Olavi Mannonen — Modern Pentathlon, Men's Team Competition
 Kauko Hänninen, Veli Lehtelä, Matti Niemi, Toimi Pitkänen, and Reino Poutanen — Rowing, Men's Coxed Fours
 Vilho Ylönen — Shooting, Men's Free Rifle, Three Positions
 Erkki Penttilä — Wrestling, Men's Freestyle Featherweight
 Taisto Kangasniemi — Wrestling, Men's Freestyle Heavyweight

Athletics

Men's Marathon 
Veikko Karvonen — 2:27:47 (→  Bronze Medal)
Eino Oksanen — 2:36:10 (→ 10th place)
Paavo Kotila — 2:37:10 (→ 13th place)

Boxing

Canoeing

Cycling

Sprint
Paul Nyman — 18th place

Time trial
Paul Nyman — 1:16.1 (→ 18th place)

Individual road race
Paul Nyman — 5:23:40 (→ 11th place)

Diving

Men's 10m Platform
Helge Vasenius
 Preliminary Round — 66.63 (→ did not advance, 16th place)

Fencing

Two fencers, both men, represented Finland in 1956.

Men's épée
 Rolf Wiik
 Wäinö Korhonen

Gymnastics

Modern pentathlon

Three male pentathletes represented Finland in 1956. Wäinö Korhonen won the bronze and Ole Mannonen won the silver in the individual event. In the team event, the Finnish pentathletes won bronze.

Individual
 Ole Mannonen
 Wäinö Korhonen
 Berndt Katter

Team
 Ole Mannonen
 Wäinö Korhonen
 Berndt Katter

Rowing

Finland had five male rowers participate in two out of seven rowing events in 1956.

 Men's coxless four
 Kauko Hänninen
 Reino Poutanen
 Veli Lehtelä
 Toimi Pitkänen

 Men's coxed four
 Kauko Hänninen
 Reino Poutanen
 Veli Lehtelä
 Toimi Pitkänen
 Matti Niemi (cox)

Sailing

Shooting

Four shooters represented Finland in 1956. Pentti Linnosvuo won gold in the 50 m pistol and Vilho Ylönen won bronze in the 300 m rifle, three positions.

25 m pistol
 Pentti Linnosvuo
 Kalle Sievänen

50 m pistol
 Pentti Linnosvuo
 Kalle Sievänen

300 m rifle, three positions
 Vilho Ylönen
 Jorma Taitto

50 m rifle, three positions
 Vilho Ylönen
 Jorma Taitto

50 m rifle, prone
 Vilho Ylönen
 Jorma Taitto

Swimming

Weightlifting

Wrestling

 Viljo Punkari

References

External links
Official Olympic Reports
International Olympic Committee results database

Nations at the 1956 Summer Olympics
1956
1956 in Finnish sport